The men's shot put event at the 2003 All-Africa Games was held in Abuja, Nigeria.

Results

References

Shot